"Stormy Blues" is a song written by Billie Holiday

Recording session
Session #71: Los Angeles, September 3, 1954 Verve records, Billie Holiday & Her Orchestra with Harry "Sweets" Edison (trumpet), Willie Smith (alto saxophone), Bobby Tucker (piano), Barney Kessel (guitar), Red Callender (bass), Chico Hamilton (drums), Billie Holiday (vocals)

References

External links
 Billie Holiday discography

1954 songs
Jazz songs
Songs written by Billie Holiday
1954 singles
Verve Records singles
Billie Holiday songs